The 2020 United States House of Representatives elections in Indiana was held on November 3, 2020, to elect the nine U.S. representatives from the state of Indiana, one from each of the state's nine congressional districts. The elections coincided with the 2020 U.S. presidential election, as well as other elections to the House of Representatives, elections to the United States Senate and various state and local elections.

Results

District 1 

The 1st district encompasses Northwest Indiana, taking in the eastern Chicago metropolitan area, including Hammond and Gary, as well as Lake County, Porter County and western LaPorte County. The incumbent is Democrat Pete Visclosky, who was re-elected with 65.1% of the vote in 2018. On November 6, 2019, Visclosky announced he would retire and not run for re-election.

Democratic primary

Candidates

Declared
Melissa Borom, former staffer to Pete Visclosky
Carrie Castro, attorney
Scott Costello, hospital behavioral health director
Tony Daggett, U.S. Army veteran
Ryan Farrar, former teacher
Sabrina Haake, founder of the Gary Animal Welfare Coalition
John Henry Hall, attorney and widower of former U.S. Representative Katie Hall
Jim Harper, attorney and nominee for Indiana Secretary of State in 2018
Thomas McDermott Jr., mayor of Hammond
Wendell Mosby, former Prairie State Community College trustee
Frank J. Mrvan, North Township trustee and son of Frank Mrvan
Mara Candelaria Reardon, state representative
Jayson Reeves, engineer
Andrew Sylwestrowicz, former Merrillville town councilman

Declined
Karen Freeman-Wilson, mayor of Gary
Ragen Hatcher, state representative
Eddie Melton, state senator
Pete Visclosky, incumbent U.S. Representative

Primary results

Republican primary

Candidates

Declared
Dion Bergeron, real estate broker
Mont Handley, businessman
Spencer Lemmons, police officer
Mark Leyva, perennial candidate
Bill Powers
Delano Scaife, police officer

Declined
Jon Costas, former mayor of Valparaiso
 Bill Hanna, CEO of Northwest Indiana Regional Development Authority

Primary results

Libertarian primary

Candidates

Declared
Edward Strauss

General election

Predictions

Results

District 2 

The 2nd district is located in north central Indiana taking in Michiana including South Bend, Mishawaka, and Elkhart. The incumbent is Republican Jackie Walorski, who was re-elected with 54.8% of the vote in 2018.

Republican primary

Candidates

Declared
Christopher Davis
 Jackie Walorski, incumbent U.S. Representative

Endorsements

Primary results

Democratic primary

Candidates

Declared
 Pat Hackett, attorney and candidate for Indiana's 2nd congressional district in 2018
 Ellen Marks, attorney

Endorsements

Primary results

General election

Predictions

Endorsements

Results

District 3

The 3rd district is based in northeastern Indiana, taking in Fort Wayne and the surrounding areas. The incumbent is Republican Jim Banks, who was re-elected with 64.7% of the vote in 2018.

Republican primary

Candidates

Declared
 Chris Magiera, physician
 Jim Banks, incumbent U.S. Representative

Primary results

Democratic primary

Candidates

Declared
 Chip Coldiron, teacher
Jean-Paul Kalonji, truck driver
 Carlos Marcano, tiling contractor
Thomas Schrader, perennial candidate

Endorsements

Primary results

General election

Predictions

Results

District 4

The 4th district is located in west-central Indiana taking in Lafayette, Kokomo, and the western suburbs of Indianapolis. The incumbent is Republican Jim Baird, who was elected with 64.1% of the vote in 2018.

Republican primary

Candidates

Declared
 Jim Baird, incumbent U.S. Representative

Primary results

Democratic primary

Candidates

Declared
 Ben Frederick
 Joe Mackey, retired machinist
 Howard Pollchik
 Veronikka Ziol, transgender rights activist

Primary results

General election

Predictions

Results

District 5

The 5th district encompasses northern Indianapolis and its eastern and northern suburbs, including Marion, Carmel, Anderson, Noblesville, Fishers, and parts of Kokomo. The incumbent was Republican Susan Brooks, who was re-elected with 56.8% of the vote in 2018, and announced on June 14, 2019 that she would not seek re-election to a 5th term in Congress.

Republican primary

Declared 
Kent W. Abernathy, former commissioner of  Indiana's Bureau of Motor Vehicles
Andrew Bales, retired teacher
 Micah Beckwith, pastor
 Carl Brizzi, former Marion County prosecutor
Allen Davidson, highway engineer
Chuck Dietzen, physician and founder of Timmy Global Health
 Beth Henderson, nurse
Matt Hook, retired accountant and attorney
Matthew Hullinger
Kelly Mitchell, Indiana State Treasurer
 Danny Niederberger, accountant
Mark Small, attorney and progressive activist
 Victoria Spartz, state senator
Russell Stwalley
Victor Wakley, executive director of Save Our Veterans, Inc.

Withdrawn 
Steve Braun, former commissioner of the Indiana Department of Workforce Development, candidate for Indiana's 4th congressional district in 2018 and brother of U.S. Senator Mike Braun (suspended campaign due to health issues)

Declined 
 Jerome Adams, Surgeon General and former Indiana Health Commissioner
 Greg Ballard, former mayor of Indianapolis
 Brian Bosma, Speaker of the Indiana House of Representatives
 James Brainard, mayor of Carmel
 Susan Brooks, incumbent U.S. Representative
 Suzanne Crouch, Lieutenant Governor of Indiana (running for re-election)
 Mike Delph, former state senator
 Scott Fadness, mayor of Fishers
 Mitch Frazier, businessman
 Jennifer Hallowell, political consultant
 Kyle Hupfer, chairman of the Indiana Republican Party
 Todd Huston, state representative
 Leah McGrath, deputy mayor of Fishers and Vice Chair of the Indiana Republican Party
 Michael McQuillen, Minority Leader of the Indianapolis City-County Council
 Todd Rokita, former U.S. Representative for Indiana's 4th congressional district and candidate for U.S. Senate in 2018 (endorsed Delph)
 John Ruckelshaus, state senator
 Megan Savage, Chief of Staff to Susan Brooks
 Pete Seat, executive director of the Indiana Republican Party and former White House spokesman

Endorsements

Polling

Primary results

Democratic primary

Candidates

Declared
 Jennifer Christie, environmental chemist
 Christina Hale, former state representative and nominee for Lieutenant Governor of Indiana in 2016
 Andy Jacobs Jr., Marion County deputy prosecutor and son of Andrew Jacobs Jr.
 Dee Thornton, corporate consultant and nominee for Indiana's 5th congressional district in 2018
Ralph Spelbring, perennial candidate

Declined
 Carey Hamilton, state representative

Endorsements

Primary results

Libertarian primary

Candidates

Declared
Ken Tucker

General election

Debates
Complete video of debate, September 22, 2020

Predictions

Endorsements

Polling

with Generic Republican and Generic Democrat

Results

District 6

The 6th district is located in southeastern Indiana, taking in Muncie, Columbus, Richmond and the eastern exurbs of Indianapolis. The incumbent is Republican Greg Pence, who was elected with 63.8% of the vote in 2018.

Republican primary

Candidates

Declared
 Mike Campbell
 Greg Pence, incumbent U.S. Representative

Primary results

Democratic primary

Candidates

Declared
 George Holland
 Jeannine Lee Lake, journalist and nominee for Indiana's 6th congressional district in 2018
 Barry Welsh, minister

Primary results

Libertarian primary

Candidates

Declared
Tom Ferkinhoff

General election

Predictions

Results

District 7

The 7th district is centered around Indianapolis and the surrounding suburbs. The incumbent is Democrat André Carson, who was re-elected with 64.9% of the vote in 2018.

Democratic primary

Candidates

Declared
 André Carson, incumbent U.S. Representative
 Pierre Quincy Pullins, U.S. Army veteran

Primary results

Republican primary

Candidates

Declared
 Jon J. Davis
 Douglas L. Merrill
 JD Miniear
 Martin Ramey
 Susan Marie Smith
 Gerald Walters

Primary results

Libertarian primary

Candidates

Declared
 Andrew Warner, small business owner

General election

Predictions

Results

District 8

The 8th district is based in southwestern and west central Indiana, and includes the cities of Evansville and Terre Haute. The incumbent is Republican Larry Bucshon, who was re-elected with 64.4% of the vote in 2018.

Republican primary

Candidates

Declared
 Larry Bucshon, incumbent U.S. Representative

Primary results

Democratic primary

Candidates

Declared
Ron Drake, attorney and former state legislator
Thomasina Marsili, registered emergency medical technician
Mike Webster, computer distributions manager for SABIC

Declined
John R. Gregg, former speaker of the Indiana House of Representatives and nominee for Governor of Indiana in 2012 and 2016
Jonathan Weinzapfel, former mayor of Evansville (running for Attorney General)
Charlie Wyatt, mayor of Boonville

Endorsements

Primary results

Libertarian primary

Candidates

Declared
James D. Rodenberger

General election

Predictions

Results

District 9

The 9th district is based in south central Indiana, and includes the cities of Bloomington and Jeffersonville. The incumbent is Republican Trey Hollingsworth, who was re-elected with 56.5% of the vote in 2018.

Republican primary

Candidates

Declared
Trey Hollingsworth, incumbent U.S. Representative

Endorsements

Primary results

Democratic primary

Candidates

Declared
D. Liam Dorris, U.S. Marine Corps veteran
Brandon Hood, progressive activist
James O’Gabhann, teacher
Mark Powell, Lutheran pastor
Andy Ruff, former Bloomington city councilman

Endorsements

Primary results

Libertarian primary

Candidates

Declared
Tonya Lynn Millis

General election

Endorsements

Predictions

Results

See also
 2020 Indiana elections

Notes

Partisan clients

References

External links
 
 
  (State affiliate of the U.S. League of Women Voters)
 

Official campaign websites for 1st district candidates
 Mark Leyva (R) for Congress
 Frank J. Mrvan (D) for Congress
 Edward Strauss (L) for Congress

Official campaign websites for 2nd district candidates
 Pat Hackett (D) for Congress
 Jackie Walorski (R) for Congress

Official campaign websites for 3rd district candidates
 Jim Banks (R) for Congress
 Chip Coldiron (D) for Congress

Official campaign websites for 4th district candidates
 Jim Baird (R) for Congress
 Joe Mackey (D) for Congress

Official campaign websites for 5th district candidates
 Christina Hale (D) for Congress
 Victoria Spartz (R) for Congress
 Ken Tucker (L) for Congress

Official campaign websites for 6th district candidates
 Jeannine Lee Lake (D) for Congress
 Greg Pence (R) for Congress

Official campaign websites for 7th district candidates
 André Carson (D) for Congress
 Susan Marie Smith (R) for Congress
 Andrew Warner (L) for Congress 

Official campaign websites for 8th district candidates
 Larry Bucshon (R) for Congress
 Thomasina Marsili (D) for Congress
 James D. Rodenberger (L) for Congress

Official campaign websites for 9th district candidates
 Trey Hollingsworth (R) for Congress
 Tonya Lynn Millis (L) for Congress
 Andy Ruff (D) for Congress 

Indiana
2020
House